John James Galloway (18 February 1818 – 30 June 1883) was an early surveyor of Australia and Member of the Queensland Legislative Council.

Early life 
In 1837, at the age of 19, Galloway traveled with his father Thomas Galloway (who was serving as the ship's surgeon) to Australia. John Galloway had secured an appointment as an assistant surveyor in Australia. From there he served temporarily as assistant surveyor to New Zealand in 1840. Beginning in 1842 he acted as Commissioner for Crown Lands within the Boundaries. He became a licensed surveyor in 1844, which enabled him to in 1847 secure appointment as a full surveyor.

Career 
Galloway served two terms in the Queensland Legislative Council. His first term was from 1 May 1860 until 1 May 1865 and the second was from 13 November 1869 until 17 April 1872.

Business 
He had purchased a considerable amount of urban property including around the area that now bears his name, Galloway's Hill.

Later life 
Galloway returned to England in 1875. He died suddenly in Brussels, Belgium on 30 June 1883 aged 64 years. He was buried in Teignmouth, Devon, England.

References

External links
 

Members of the Queensland Legislative Council
1819 births
1883 deaths
19th-century Australian politicians